John Scofield  is a solo studio recording by American jazz guitarist John Scofield. ECM released the album on 6 May 2022. The record contains 13 tracks: Scofield's originals as well as jazz, country, and rock'n'roll standards.

Reception
Thom Jurek of AllMusic stated, "Fueled by almost constant string bending and almost lush chord voicings, his inherent lyricism reflects the songwriter's poignant resignation. Scofield has distilled five decades of experience into these 13 songs. While the endeavor might initially appear slight, one listen will disavow that notion as he reveals an abundance of musical wisdom and sophistication in his approach to recording solo." Allen Michie of The Arts Fuse commented, "A solo album offers artists an opportunity to spotlight their style and approach. There is no better way to do that than to play some standards that many others have performed before. Scofield chooses wisely, selecting some unexpected tunes that show different facets of his personality and history." Andy Robson of Jazzwise noted, "It’s been noted by wiser men than I that for some artists, a Rollins or a Mingus, the gap between the doing and being of music simply dissolves. John Scofield has reached this stage, as perfectly exemplified by this solo album." Chris Pearson of The Times added, "He is as fiery as ever, plugged in and using loops to give himself a background groove on some of his gritty originals or putting a punkish spin on romantic ballads."

Track listing

Personnel
John Scofield – electric guitar, loops, liner notes
Sascha Kleis – design
Tyler McDiarmid – engineer
Manfred Eicher – executive producer
Christoph Stickel – mastering
Luciano Rossetti – cover photo

References 

2022 albums
John Scofield albums
ECM Records albums
Albums produced by Manfred Eicher